Thompsonella is a genus of plants in the family Crassulaceae.  It includes about eight species endemic to Mexico.

References

Crassulaceae
Crassulaceae genera